Leño was a Spanish hard rock band created in 1978 in Madrid.

The band members were Rosendo Mercado as guitarist and vocalist, Chiqui Mariscal as bassist and Ramiro Penas on drums. When they started to record their first album Leño, Chiqui Mariscal left the band and Tony Urbano entered as the new bassist in order to complete the recording.
This line up would continue until their break-up in 1983 at their peak of popularity. In 2012 the band was ranked number 13 on Rolling Stone's "50 Greatest Spanish rock bands".

History 
After finishing the compulsory military service in 1975, Rosendo took part recording the first album for the band Ñu. Molina and he were not on very good terms, so Rosendo left the group in 1977, and formed Leño, playing the guitar and singing. Chiqui Mariscal (bass player) and Ramiro Penas (drums) also left Ñu to join him in Leño.

They made their debut in 1978, as supporting band in a concert of Asfalto. They had been hired by Vicente Romero, who was setting up Chapa Discos ("Chapa Records"), and published the collective disc Viva el Rollo, Vol. II. Rock del Manzanares, including two songs: Este Madrid and Aprendiendo a escuchar.

In 1979 they published their first album, titled Leño. The album, produced by Teddy Bautista, contains songs with long instrumental sections, among which El tren and Este Madrid are remarkable. During the recording Mariscal left the group, and was substituted by Tony Urbano, as portrayed in the disc cover. Later it would be ranked as the 106th best Rock en Español album according to American magazine Al Borde.

In 1980 they published their second album, Más madera. Teddy Bautista's influence can be seen in that the songs are shorter and have a lighter style.

In 1981 they recorded in the Carolina club the En directo live disc. The disc sold very well, even though the recording quality was not very good. This disc includes one of Rosendo's best-known songs, Maneras de vivir. Luz Casal (chorus) and Teddy Bautista (keyboards) play with them.

The last official disc of Leño, ¡Corre, corre!, was made with more resources, thanks to the success of their previous one. It was recorded at Ian Gillan's recording studio located in London, with the production of Carlos Narea. Notable songs include Sorprendente and ¡Qué desilusión!.
The intention was to achieve prestige both inside and outside Spain but when the critics of Kerrang! evaluated the album, the result was awful. Some of them claimed that was impossible to rate the album because of the language. Later, in 2012 the album would be ranked number 19 on Rolling Stone's "50 Greatest Spanish rock albums".

In 1983 they took part in Rock de una noche de verano, a tour organized by Miguel Ríos that would become a milestone in the Spanish rock history, by organizing a long series of concerts all around Spain, with big sound and light resources. In the 1983 fall, in their best success moment, they decided to break up.
Chiqui Mariscal died in 2008.
In 2010, the band reunited for the release of their album tribute Bajo la corteza: 26 canciones de Leño to perform a short concert.

Discography

Studio albums 
 Leño – 1979
 Más madera – 1980
 ¡Corre, corre! – 1982

Live albums 
 En Directo – 1981
 Vivo '83 – 2006

Singles 
 Este Madrid / Aprendiendo a escuchar(non-album single) – 1978
 El tren – 1980
 El oportunista – 1980
 La noche de que te hablé / Sin solución"  – 1980
 Maneras de vivir (Studio version) / Todo es más sencillo*(non-album single) – 1981
 Corre, corre / Sorprendente – 1982
 Que tire la toalla! / Sorprendente – 1982
 Maneras de vivir (CD single, BMG) – 1997

Compilation albums 
 Maneras de vivir – 1997
 Indirecto – 1992
 Nos va la marcha (Soundtrack) – 1978
 Bajo la corteza: 26 canciones de Leño (Tribute) – 2010

Box Sets 
 Leño 1978-1983 – 2013

Notes

References 
 BABAS, Kike, y TURRÓN, Kike: La Sana Intención. Conversaciones con Rosendo. Zona de Obras / SGAE. Madrid, 2003
 FERNÁNDEZ, Iñaki: Rosendo. Historia del rock urbano. Editorial La máscara. Valencia, 1997. .
 VV.AA.: Rosendo. Publicaciones y Ediciones SGAE. Madrid, 1997.

External links
Rosendo's Official website

Musical groups from Madrid
Spanish hard rock musical groups
Rock en Español music groups